|}

The Prix Gontaut-Biron is a Group 3 flat horse race in France open to thoroughbreds aged four years or older. It is run at Deauville over a distance of 2,000 metres (about 1¼ miles), and it is scheduled to take place each year in August.

History
The event is named in memory of Antoine de Gontaut-Biron (died 1917), a member of the Société des Courses de Deauville, a former governing body at the venue. The race was established in 1919, and it was originally open to horses aged three or older. The inaugural running was contested over 1,600 metres, and it was extended to 2,400 metres in 1920.

Deauville Racecourse was closed during World War II, and the Prix Gontaut-Biron was cancelled in 1940. For the remainder of this period it was switched between Maisons-Laffitte (1941–43, 1945) and Auteuil (1944).

The distance of the race was increased to 2,600 metres in 1955, and cut to 2,000 metres in 1956. It was restored to 2,400 metres in 1958, and from this point the race was closed to three-year-olds. Its current spell over 2,000 metres began in 1964.

The Prix Gontaut-Biron has been sponsored by the Hong Kong Jockey Club since 2009.

Records
<div style="font-size:90%">
Most successful horse (2 wins):
 Hernando – 1994, 1995
 Wally - 2021, 2022

Leading jockey (4 wins):
 Roger Brethès – Rabican (1927), Ping Pong (1935), Samovar (1936), Morosini (1941)
 Alfred Gibert – Jefferson (1971), Nemr (1981), Great  (1982), Arc (1987)
 Olivier Peslier – Agol Lack (2000), Slew the Red (2001), Carnival Dancer (2003), Vision d'Etat (2010) 

Leading trainer (5 wins):
 André Fabre – Cariellor (1985), Agol Lack (2000), Slew the Red (2001), Crossharbour (2009), New Bay (2016)Leading owner (3 wins):
 Ralph B. Strassburger – Berthe (1948), Montaval (1956), Rumesnil (1957) Mahmoud Fustok – Nemr (1981), Great  (1982), Over the Ocean (1986) Khalid Abdullah – General Holme (1983), Crossharbour (2009), New Bay (2016)</div>

Winners since 1979

Earlier winners

 1919: Saint Souplet
 1920: Take a Step
 1921: Nephthys
 1922: Grillemont
 1923: Keror
 1924: Almaviva
 1925: Cerfeuil
 1926: Aethelstan
 1927: Rabican
 1928: Huntersdale
 1929: Grock
 1930: Hotweed
 1931: Folio
 1932: Bievres
 1933: Minestrone
 1934: Astronomer
 1935: Ping Pong
 1936: Samovar
 1937: Paix des Dames
 1938: Ker Flobert
 1939: Palais Cardinal
 1940: no race 1941: Morosini
 1942: Legende
 1943: Chateauroux
 1944: Sabran
 1945:
 1946:
 1947: Cappielluca
 1948: Berthe
 1949: Fleury
 1950: Kilette
 1951: Lacaduv
 1952: Vamos
 1953: Frere Georges
 1954:
 1955: Rosati
 1956: Montaval
 1957: Rumesnil
 1958:
 1959: Etwild
 1960: Sheshoon
 1961: Hautain
 1962: Liberty Truck
 1963:
 1964: Frontin
 1965: Tobrouk
 1966: Sigebert
 1967: Caldarello
 1968: Frontal
 1969: Grandier
 1970: Shoemaker
 1971: Jefferson
 1972: Boreen
 1973: Folkestone
 1974: Ksar
 1975: Record Run
 1976: Larkhill
 1977: Iron Duke
 1978: Gairloch

See also
 List of French flat horse races

References

 France Galop / Racing Post:

 france-galop.com – A Brief History: Prix Gontaut-Biron. galop.courses-france.com – Prix Gontaut-Biron – Palmarès depuis 1980. galopp-sieger.de – Prix Gontaut-Biron. horseracingintfed.com – International Federation of Horseracing Authorities – Prix Gontaut-Biron (2017). pedigreequery.com – Prix Gontaut-Biron – Deauville.''

Open middle distance horse races
Deauville-La Touques Racecourse
Horse races in France
Recurring sporting events established in 1919